Margaret Thatcher was Prime Minister of the United Kingdom from 4 May 1979 to 28 November 1990, during which time she led a Conservative majority government. She was the first woman to hold that office. During her premiership, Thatcher moved to liberalise the British economy through deregulation, privatisation, and the promotion of entrepreneurialism.

This article details the second Thatcher ministry she led at the invitation of Queen Elizabeth II from 1983 to 1987.

Formation

The Conservative government was re-elected in June 1983 with a majority of 144 seats, with Labour in opposition having a mere 209 seats after its worst postwar electoral performance, seeing off a close challenge from the SDP–Liberal Alliance who came close to them on votes though not with seats.

With inflation firmly under control and union reforms contributing towards the lowest level of strikes since the early 1950s, the Conservatives were now faced with the challenge of reducing unemployment from a record high of 3,200,000.

March 1984 saw the beginning of a miners' strike which would last for 12 months and divide the country as Mrs Thatcher announced extensive pit closures which would ultimately cost thousands of miners their jobs as well, while the remaining pits were set to be privatised in the proposed sell-off of the National Coal Board. Privatisation of utilities and heavy industry was becoming a key symbol of Thatcherism, with the likes of British Telecom also transferring from public to private ownership.

Michael Foot had stepped down as Labour leader following the 1983 general election. The man elected by Labour with the task of getting them back into government was Neil Kinnock. He proved himself as a fierce rival to Thatcher, and more than once during the 1983–87 parliament, the opinion polls showed Labour (and very occasionally the Alliance) in the lead, although a huge swing was required at a general election if the Conservative government was to be ousted.

The challenge from the SDP–Liberal Alliance was becoming weaker, despite their brief lead of the opinion polls during 1985.

However, economic growth following recession had been re-established by the beginning of this parliament and by 1987 the economy was well on the road to recovery. However, although unemployment which had peaked at nearly 3,300,000 during 1984 remained above 3,000,000 by the turn of 1987, with the opinion polls all showing a Tory lead, it was anticipated that Thatcher would call the next general election earlier than the deadline of June 1988.

Fate

A general election was called for 11 June 1987, and the Conservatives triumphed for the third election in succession. Labour, on the other hand, achieved a better election result than it had the previous time (and also managed to reduce the Conservative majority), with more than 30% of the vote, while the SDP–Liberal Alliance floundered and was soon disbanded as the Social Democratic Party and Liberal Party merged to form the Social and Liberal Democrats (who soon became the Liberal Democrats).

Cabinet

June 1983 to June 1987
:

Margaret Thatcher – Prime Minister
The Viscount Whitelaw – Deputy Prime Minister and Leader of the House of Lords and Lord President of the Council
The Lord Hailsham of St Marylebone – Lord High Chancellor of Great Britain
John Biffen – Leader of the House of Commons and Lord Keeper of the Privy Seal
Nigel Lawson – Chancellor of the Exchequer
Peter Rees – Chief Secretary to the Treasury
Sir Geoffrey Howe – Foreign Secretary
Leon Brittan – Home Secretary
Michael Jopling – Minister of Agriculture, Fisheries and Food
Michael Heseltine – Secretary of State for Defence
Sir Keith Joseph – Secretary of State for Education
Norman Tebbit – Secretary of State for Employment
Peter Walker – Secretary of State for Energy
Patrick Jenkin – Secretary of State for the Environment
Norman Fowler – Secretary of State for Health
The Lord Cockfield – Chancellor of the Duchy of Lancaster
Jim Prior – Secretary of State for Northern Ireland
George Younger – Secretary of State for Scotland
Cecil Parkinson – Secretary of State for Trade and Industry and President of the Board of Trade
Tom King – Secretary of State for Transport
Nicholas Edwards – Secretary of State for Wales
John Wakeham – Chief Whip of the House of Commons and Parliamentary Secretary to the Treasury

Changes
October 1983
Tom King succeeded Norman Tebbit as Secretary of State for Employment.
Norman Tebbit succeeded Cecil Parkinson as Secretary of State for Trade and Industry.
Nicholas Ridley succeeded Tom King as Secretary of State for Transport.
September 1984
Earl of Gowrie succeeded Lord Cockfield as Chancellor of the Duchy of Lancaster.
Douglas Hurd succeeded Jim Prior  as Secretary of State for Northern Ireland.
Lord Young of Graffham enters the Cabinet as Minister without Portfolio.
September 1985
Lord Young of Graffham succeeded Tom King as Secretary of State for Employment.
Kenneth Baker succeeded Patrick Jenkin as Secretary of State for the Environment.
Norman Tebbit succeeded Earl of Gowrie as Chancellor of the Duchy of Lancaster.
Tom King succeeded Douglas Hurd as Secretary of State for Northern Ireland.
Kenneth Clarke enters the Cabinet as Paymaster-General.
Leon Brittan succeeded Norman Tebbit as Secretary of State for Trade and Industry.
John MacGregor succeeded Peter Rees as Chief Secretary to the Treasury.
Douglas Hurd succeeded Leon Brittan as Home Secretary.
early January 1986Malcolm Rifkind succeeded George Younger as Secretary of State for Scotland.  Younger succeeded Michael Heseltine as Secretary of State for Defence.
late January 1986Paul Channon succeeded Leon Brittan as Secretary of State for Trade and Industry.
May 1986
Nicholas Ridley succeeded Kenneth Baker as Secretary of State for the Environment. John Moore succeeded Ridley as Secretary of State for Transport.
Kenneth Baker succeeded Keith Joseph as Secretary of State for Education and Science.

List of ministers
Members of the Cabinet are in bold face.

Notes

References

Government
1980s in the United Kingdom
1983 establishments in the United Kingdom
1987 disestablishments in the United Kingdom
Ministry 2
Ministries of Elizabeth II
British ministries
Cabinets established in 1983
Cabinets disestablished in 1987

pl:Trzeci rząd Margaret Thatcher